General  Mohsen Vezvaei  (Persian: محسن وزوایی ; 29 July 1960 – 30 April 1982) was an officer of the Islamic Revolutionary Guard Corps who was killed during the Iran–Iraq War in Operation Beit ol-Moqaddas. He was also involved in street protests against the Shah of Iran, and later in the 1979 Iranian hostage crisis.

Early life 
Vezvaei was born in 1960 in Tehran. He achieved third place in the Iranian University Entrance Exam and was admitted to Sharif University to study chemical engineering in 1976. Before the Islamic Revolution he joined the same opposition groups as his father. His father was associated with Abol-Ghasem Kashani, was politically active and had always resisted the Pahlavi dynasty. During the Iran-Iraq war he became one of the prominent commanders of the Iranian Revolutionary Guard Corps (IRGC). He was killed in Operation Beit ol-Moqaddas and was buried in Behesht-e Zahra, Tehran.

Iranian Revolution 
When a branch of Anjoman-e Eslami (Islamic Association of Students) was established at Sharif University, Vezvaei joined it and later became the head of opposition groups at the university. He actively participated in anti-regime protests. He also participated in armed conflict and helped with the occupation of the Eshratabad and Jamshidieh garrisons. After the victory of the Islamic Revolution he was a member of Jahad-e Sazandegi and went to Lorestan Province to serve. He was a member of Muslim Student Followers of the Imam's Line, an Iranian student group that occupied the U.S. embassy in Tehran on 4 November 1979. This occupation caused the hostage crisis where 52 American diplomats were held hostage for 444 days. He was the Muslim Student Followers of the Imam's Line's translator and did interviews with foreign media.

Zdf channel's interview with Vezvaei 
The following is a part of Zdf channel's interview with Vezvaei:

We also are familiar with the laws and diplomatic affairs. We know the safety of diplomats in foreign countries. Furthermore, our Islamic laws recommend us to deal appropriately with guests, but unfortunately here was not an embassy, and these men were not diplomats. Maybe you do not believe but after six month of revolution we found that most of the plots were started from here. ... and it's my question, if here is an embassy why have these complex systems of surveillance and intelligence been installed here and have they destroyed large amount of documents by shredders?

Iran–Iraq War 
In 1979, with the establishment of the Islamic Revolutionary Guard Corps, he joined this institution and was appointed  commander of the Army Signal Corps and then supervisor of the Army Intelligence Unit.

When the Iran–Iraq War began, he deployed to the front line, serving in the Bazi Deraz Mountains. He also participated in operations like Operation Beit ol-Moqaddas and Operation Before the Dawn. Vezvaei and his companions captured 350 members of the Iraqi Commando Battalion with very few men. He was wounded multiple times during the war.

Death 
Vezvaei was killed at the battle front in 1982 when he was aged 22.

He once said: "If you found my corpse, throw it over mines ... maybe at least my corpse helps Islamic government."

Bibliography 
 Hampaye Saeghe (Along with Lightning)
 Ghoghnoose Fateh (The Phoenix Won)
 Oghabane Bazi Deraz (Eagles of Bazi Deraz)

See also
 Iran–Iraq War
 List of Iranian commanders in the Iran–Iraq War

References

Iranian military personnel killed in the Iran–Iraq War
Sharif University of Technology alumni
1960 births
1982 deaths